Thomas Enqvist was the defending champion and won in the final 7–5, 6–4, 7–6(7–0) against Todd Martin.

Seeds

  Wayne Ferreira (first round)
  Todd Martin (final)
  Thomas Enqvist (champion)
  Albert Costa (first round)
  Jan Siemerink (second round)
  Stefan Edberg (first round)
  Richey Reneberg (quarterfinals)
 n/a

Draw

Final

Section 1

Section 2

References
 Singles draw

Singles
1996 Stockholm Open